Mykola Shevchenko  is a former Ukrainian football player and football manager. He also managed Indian I-League side Churchill Brothers.

Playing career
Born in Ukraine, Shevchenko played for National Football League sides Churchill Brothers and Dempo SC during his playing days in India. He has also appeared with another NFL side FC Kochin before joining two Goan sides, during the 1997 season.

Coaching career

Churchill Brothers: 2017
On 13 November 2017, it was announced that Shevchenko would return to Churchill Brothers as their head coach. His first game as coach occurred on 2 December 2017 when Churchill Brothers took on Shillong Lajong, resulting in a 2–0 loss. After poor performance of the team he was sacked from the position.

Statistics

Managerial statistics
.

Honours
FC Kochin
Durand Cup: 1997

References

Living people
National Football League (India) players
Ukrainian footballers
Ukrainian football managers
FC Kochin players
Churchill Brothers FC Goa managers
I-League managers
Expatriate football managers in India
Association football defenders
1967 births
Footballers from Kyiv